Khalid Saeed Khan, born March 5, 1955, Principal of College of Physiotherapy in the Mayo Hospital at Lahore, Pakistan.

" Physiotherapy is essentially one of the healing sciences which pertains to the assessment of Musculo skeletal and Neurological disorders of function including pain and those of Psychosomatic origin. It also deals with treatment by natural sources, based on movement, manual therapy and other physical agents to relieve pain, promote healing, prevent or ameliorate deformity, improve function, body health, stimulate or habilitate development in a child or rehabilitate those impaired by disease or trauma."

Academic life 
He got his B.Sc. Physiotherapy degree from JPMC Karachi, 1978. He also did a course of Sports Medicine by Dr. Thomas Freud Canada organized by Federation of International de Football Association held at Lahore in 1992. He was appointed as the Head of Physiotherapy Department Jinnah Hospital Lahore. He, later on became the Principal of Allama Iqbal College of Physiotherapy, Allama Iqbal Medical Complex, Lahore, (Pakistan). .

Honors 
He was initially appointment as Assistant Physiotherapist in 1980. Later, in 1986, he became a Lecture Physiotherapist. He was later on promoted to a rank of BS. 19 on December 1, 1999.

Articles 
He has written various articles related to physiotherapy. Major of them are:

 Role of Physiotherapy in Integumentary.

Social services 
He attended the Annual international conference of Indian Association of Physiotherapist held in March 1984 at King George Medical College, Lukhnow. U P India. He Organized first Physiotherapy Congress under the flag Punjab Health Department Physiotherapists association in December 1984. He also attended the Conference for torture victim Patients at Lahore in 1991.

See also 
 Occupational Therapy
 Doctor of Physical Therapy

References

External links 

 http://www.aicp.edu.pk/index.php?option=com_content&view=article&id=94&Itemid=224

Living people
Pakistani physiotherapists
1954 births
Academic staff of King Edward Medical University